Svetlovka is a rural locality (a village) in Rassvetovsky Selsoviet, Belebeyevsky District, Bashkortostan, Russia. The population was 38 as of 2010. There is 1 street.

Geography 
Svetlovka is located 5 km southwest of Belebey (the district's administrative centre) by road. Belebey is the nearest rural locality.

References 

Rural localities in Belebeyevsky District